Whosoever South is an American Christian music country rap trio signed to Pit Bull Productions. They released, Goin Home in 2013, and Come on In in 2014.

Background
The Christian hip hop and Christian country trio started in 2008, with members husband-and-wife, Rowdy and Sarah Eunice, alongside, Mike Mitchell.

History
Whosoever South released Goin Home, on May 14, 2013, with Pit Bull Productions. Their subsequent release, Come on In, came out on October 7, 2014, from Pit Bull Productions.

Members
 Rowdy Eunice
 Sarah Eunice
 Mike Mitchell

Discography
Studio albums
 Goin Home (May 14, 2013, Pit Bull)
 Come on In (October 7, 2014, Pit Bull)
 Backroads & Small Towns (October 3, 2019, Pit Bull)

References

Musical groups established in 2008
Christian hip hop groups
American hip hop groups